Nepora or Nipor is a village in Anantnag tehsil in Anantnag district in Jammu and Kashmir.
This village lies between Anantnag and Kulgam districts and acts as a bordering village between two districts.
The nearest railway station is Sadura railway station.
A tributary of river Jehlum 'Sandran' flows through the village.

Demographics
The Nepora village consist of 3,163 and the residents mostly speaks Kashmiri language. While Urdu is also spoken as second language.

Transport

By Rail
Sadura Railway Station & Anantnag Railway Station are the closest railway stations to Nepora. However, Jammu Tawi Railway Station is another major railway station 243 km away from Nepora.

By Road
Srinagar-Kanyakumari road -NH 44 is the nearest Highway. The village will come on the right side of this road when you are going to Srinagar.

By Air
The nearest airport is Srinagar International Airport or Sheikh-ul-Alam Airport (IATA: SXR, ICAO: VISR), which is approximately some 60 km away.

References

Villages in Anantnag district